Data Panik Etcetera (stylised as data Panik etcetera) is the fourth studio album by the Scottish pop group Bis, released in 2014. The album was the group's first since the band broke up in 2003.

Critical reception
The Line of Best Fit wrote: "Where the album’s first songs were both a timely update of the bis sound, and a friendly reminder of what made them great, most of the rest of the album simply sounds like it’s treading water in a sea of four-to-the-floor rhythms and Microkorg presets."

Track listing

References

External links

2014 albums
Bis (Scottish band) albums